Rachel Bendayan  (born May 10, 1980) is a Canadian politician, who was elected to the House of Commons of Canada in a by-election on February 25, 2019, following the resignation of former New Democratic Party leader Tom Mulcair. 
She was re-elected in the 2019 and 2021 Canadian federal elections.
She represents the electoral district of Outremont as a member of the Liberal Party of Canada, In December 2019, she was appointed by Prime Minister Justin Trudeau to serve as the Parliamentary Secretary to the Minister of Small Business, Export Promotion and International Trade, Mary Ng.

She previously ran as the Liberal candidate for Outremont in the 2015 Canadian federal election, coming in second and increasing the Liberal Party's vote share by a significant margin. Following the 2015 election, Bendayan served as Chief of Staff to Bardish Chagger, Minister of Small Business and Tourism.

Early life
Bendayan was born and raised in a Moroccan-Jewish family. Bendayan studied law at McGill University and obtained her degree in 2007, specializing in commercial litigation and international arbitration. 
After graduating, Bendayan was employed by the Norton Rose Fulbright law firm and also teaches at the Faculty of Law of the University of Montreal.

Political career
A member of the Liberal Party of Canada, she was a candidate for the first time in Outremont in the 2015 federal election, against Thomas Mulcair, the leader of the official opposition. She finished second with 33.4% of the vote. After the elections, she then became chief of staff to Bardish Chagger, Minister of Small Business and Tourism.

Following Thomas Mulcair's departure from political life in June 2018, Bendayan announced her intention to once again be a candidate for the Liberal Party in the next election. She was nominated as a candidate against the teacher and activist Kim Manning in December 2018, after a vote by members of the constituency. The elections were finally called to take place on February 25, When she became elected after winning with 40.4% of votes, 2,161 votes more than her nearest opponent, the NDP's Julia Sánchez with 26.1%.

Bendayan was re-elected in the 2019 federal election, obtaining 46.2% of the votes and beating her closest opponent by 10,829 votes. She was then appointed Parliamentary Secretary to the Minister of Small Business, Export Promotion and International Trade, Mary Ng, by Prime Minister Justin Trudeau.

Bendayan was elected for a third time in the 2021 federal election with 45.4% of the votes.

Antisemitic attacks
Along with other Jewish Liberal Party candidates, Bendayan has been a victim of anti-Semitic attacks during the campaign for the 2021 Canadian federal elections, with swastikas drawn on her campaign posters.

Electoral record

References

External links

Living people
1980 births
Women members of the House of Commons of Canada
Liberal Party of Canada MPs
Members of the House of Commons of Canada from Quebec
Canadian people of Moroccan-Jewish descent
Jewish Canadian politicians
21st-century Canadian politicians
21st-century Canadian women politicians
Politicians from Montreal
Jewish women politicians
People from Outremont, Quebec